Muttathe Mulla is a 1977 Indian Malayalam-language film, directed by J. Sasikumar and produced by Thiruppathi Chettiyar. The film stars Prem Nazir, Adoor Bhasi, Thikkurissy Sukumaran Nair and Jose Prakash. The film has musical score by V. Dakshinamoorthy.

Cast
Prem Nazir  as Gopi
Adoor Bhasi as Kochappan
Thikkurissy Sukumaran Nair 
Jose Prakash as Thambi
K. P. Ummer as Panikkar
M. G. Soman as Baabu
Usharani as Radha
Vidhubala as Geetha
 Meena as Kalyani (tailor)
 Kaviyoor Ponnamma as Maheswari
 T. R. Omana as Lakshmi
 Sreelatha Namboothiri as Anantham (tailor)
 Kunjan as Supran (Tailoring Assistant)
 Sudheer
 Janardhanan as Ramesh

Soundtrack
The music was composed by V. Dakshinamoorthy and the lyrics were written by Pappanamkodu Lakshmanan.

References

External links
 

1977 films
1970s Malayalam-language films
Films directed by J. Sasikumar